Dudley Bruce Ross, KC (21 May 1892 – 19 November 1984), generally referred to as Bruce or D. Bruce Ross, was an Adelaide lawyer, eventually a judge of the Supreme Court.

History
Bruce was born in Adelaide, the only son of William Alexander Ross (died 28 October 1894) and Annie Isabella Ross, née O'Halloran (27 April 1863 – c. 7 February 1937), who married on 8 May 1888. His father died when he was very young and was brought up by his mother, a granddaughter of Thomas Shuldham O'Halloran, in the home of her father T. J. S. O'Halloran at 177 Childers Street, North Adelaide.
He attended Queen's School, North Adelaide followed by St Peter's College and studied law at the University of Adelaide, graduated LLB and was admitted to the bar on 17 December 1914.

He enlisted with the Australian Army on 29 February 1916 and embarked from Melbourne with reinforcements for 120 Howitzer Battery on 2 October. He served in France and Belgium as a gunner with  the 13th Field Artillery Brigade, with 113 Howitzer Battery, later 51 Artillery Battery and 50 Battery. He returned to Australia and was discharged from the AIF on 4 December 1919.

In 1921 he joined with his uncle T. S. O'Halloran in partnership as O'Halloran & Ross.

He was a member of the Council of Law Society from 1936 to 1952 and its president 1947–1949.

During the Second World War, Ross returned to military service, serving as a legal officer with the rank of Captain.

He was appointed King's Council in 1945. He was appointed to the Supreme Court Bench in 1952, became a Supreme Court judge, serving from 20 November 1952 to 21 May 1963.

He was created a Knight of the Order of the Bath in the 1962 New Year Honours.

His remains were buried in the North Road Cemetery.

Family
Ross married Margaret Eleanor Waterhouse (6 June 1891 – 20 November 1848) on 21 July 1920. Margaret was a daughter of Herbert Whitney Waterhouse (1860–1928), closely associated with the Cheer-Up Society (as was T. J. S. O'Halloran) and Minda Home; they had a daughter Noel on 25 December 1930. They had a home in Collinswood, South Australia.

Noel married David Lindsay Hayman on 16 May 1953.

Other interests
He was a member of the Anglican Church and served as Chancellor for the Diocese of Adelaide and of Willochra.

References 

1892 births
1984 deaths
Judges of the Supreme Court of South Australia
Australian Knights Bachelor